Uzbekistan competed at the World Games 2017  in Wroclaw, Poland, from 20 July 2017 to 30 July 2017.

Competitors

Gymnastic

Rhythmic Gymnastics
Uzbekistan  has qualified at the 2017 World Games:

Women's individual event - 1 quota

Trampoline
Belarus has qualified at the 2017 World Games:

Men's Individual Tumbling - 1 quota 
Women's Synchronized Trampoline - 1 quota

References 

Nations at the 2017 World Games
2017 in Uzbekistani sport
2017